Gaston Achille Louis Aumoitte (19 December 1884 in Hanoi, Vietnam – 30 December 1957 in Sainte-Foy-la-Grande, France) was a French croquet player and Olympic champion. He received a gold medal in Singles, one ball at the 1900 Summer Olympics in Paris.

He also received a gold medal in Doubles (with Georges Johin), as the only participants in that competition.

References

External links

French croquet players
Olympic croquet players of France
Croquet players at the 1900 Summer Olympics
Olympic gold medalists for France
1884 births
1957 deaths
Medalists at the 1900 Summer Olympics
Sportspeople from Hanoi
French people in colonial Vietnam